Corneilla-del-Vercol is a commune in the Pyrénées-Orientales department in southern France.

Geography

Localisation 
Corneilla-del-Vercol is located in the canton of La Plaine d'Illibéris and in the arrondissement of Perpignan.

Population

Notable people 
 Pierre Jonquères d'Oriola (1920-2011), equestrian born in Corneilla-del-Vercol.

See also
Communes of the Pyrénées-Orientales department

References

Communes of Pyrénées-Orientales